Sant Cugat del Vallès is a town and municipality north of Barcelona, Catalonia, Spain. Known as Castrum Octavianum in antiquity (which literally means the castle of Octavianus) and as Pins del Vallès during the Second Spanish Republic, it is named after Saint Cucuphas, who is said to have been martyred on the spot now occupied by its medieval monastery. The final part of its toponym, del Vallès, is a reference to the historical county where the town is situated, Vallès.

Description
In addition to the monastery, the town's other notable buildings include the School of Architecture of the Vallès and the Centre d'Alt Rendiment (CAR, translit. High Performance Centre), a famous centre for professional sport training.

Sant Cugat has become an affluent suburb of Barcelona due to its location (only 20 kilometres from the city), its natural surroundings, and its pedestrian shopping area. Sant Cugat also offers restaurants, a concert venue, two cinemas, and one large shopping centre. It is also a political stronghold for conservative Catalan nationalism, with Convergència i Unió dominating the town's politics for 32 years up until 2019 when Esquerra Republicana de Catalunya took control of the City Council with the support of other political forces (PSC and CUP).

Sant Cugat has seen its population increase in recent years, with more births than bigger cities like Barcelona (2004). It has also practically merged with the nearby Rubí (population 72,987) and Cerdanyola del Vallès (population 58,747).

The town has its own train station with a direct metro connection into Barcelona city centre and the nearby industrial cities of Terrassa and Sabadell.

Main sights
These are some of the main sights of the municipality:
Monastery of Sant Cugat
 (10th century)
 (10th century)
Torre Negra (12th century)
 (14th century)

Demography
There are some districts, villages and towns in this municipality such as Mira-sol with 14,474 inhabitants; Valldoreix, which has a population of 8,272; La Floresta, which has 4,553 inhabitants, and Les Planes, which is inhabited by 1,290 people.

This table below shows the population of the municipality over the 20th century and the early 21st century.

Government
National Archive of Catalonia is in the commune.

Education

The main secondary schools in Sant Cugat are IES Angeleta Ferrer i Sensat de Sant Cugat and the Institut Joaquima Pla i Farreras. 
The Japanese School of Barcelona, a Japanese international school, is located in the commune. The Hoshuko Barcelona Educación Japonesa/Escuela de Educación Japonesa en Barcelona (バルセロナ補習校 Baruserona Hoshūkō), a weekend supplementary Japanese school, holds its classes in the Japanese School of Barcelona building.

The European school of Barcelona (IES) is an international school focusing on international languages from outside Spain. Some of the most popular languages studied there are English, French and Chinese.

Culture

A number of entities and clubs that promote traditional Catalan Culture exist. Among them,

 A sardana club (Entitat Sardanista de Sant Cugat) that promotes this popular Catalan dance.
 A castellers club was formed in 1996.
 A diables club was formed in 1990.
 A geganters club.

Moreover, Sant Cugat is home to several museums, including the Museu de Sant Cugat, located at the Monastery, centred on the history of the town.

Sister cities
 Daïra of Aargub, Western Sahara.
 Alba, Italy
 La Haba, Spain

See also

References

Sources
 Panareda Clopés, Josep Maria; Rios Calvet, Jaume; Rabella Vives, Josep Maria (1989). Guia de Catalunya, Barcelona: Caixa de Catalunya;  (Spanish);  (Catalan).

External links

 Government data pages 
 Tourist Information

 
Municipalities in Vallès Occidental